Jamal Aghmani or Rhmani ( – born 1958, Rabat) is a Moroccan politician of the Socialist Union of Popular Forces party. Between 2007 and 2012, he held the position of Minister of Employment and Vocational Training in the cabinet of Abbas El Fassi. He has a bachelor's in social science from the University of Mohammed V and was a professor at the same institution before becoming minister.

See also
Cabinet of Morocco

References

Living people
Government ministers of Morocco
1958 births
People from Rabat
Moroccan educators
Academic staff of Mohammed V University
Mohammed V University alumni
Socialist Union of Popular Forces politicians